Partido Popular may refer to:

 People's Party (Panama)
 People's Party (Spain, 1976), dissolved 1978
 People's Party (Spain), founded 1989
 The original name of the Popular Socialist Party (Mexico)
 Partido Popular Democrata, original name of the Social Democratic Party (Portugal)